is a North Korean footballer who plays as a goalkeeper.

Club career
Park made his debut in an Emperor's Cup game on 27 May 2018, a 2–1 win over Komazawa University.

Career statistics

Club

Notes

References

External links

1993 births
Living people
Association football people from Osaka Prefecture
Osaka Sangyo University alumni
North Korean footballers
Japanese footballers
Association football goalkeepers
FC Osaka players
Thespakusatsu Gunma players
Azul Claro Numazu players
Tochigi City FC players